Joseph Patrick Coleman (July 30, 1922 – April 9, 1997) was an American professional baseball pitcher who appeared in 223 games in Major League Baseball (MLB) over ten seasons between 1942 and 1955 for the Philadelphia Athletics, Baltimore Orioles and Detroit Tigers. He was the father of Joe Coleman, a major league pitcher for 15 seasons from 1965 to 1979 and a two-time 20-game winner, and the grandfather of Casey Coleman, a pitcher with the Chicago Cubs and the Kansas City Royals between 2010 and 2014.

A native of Medford, Massachusetts, Coleman attended Malden Catholic High School, where he was coached by Brother Gilbert Mathias who had mentored Babe Ruth as a youth in Baltimore.  In 1940, Mathias introduced Coleman to Ruth who was visiting the school. After watching Coleman pitch, Ruth took him aside and helped him throw a more effective curveball.

Coleman missed the 1943–1945 seasons while serving in the United States Navy during World War II.  Along with other notable major league baseball players including Ted Williams and Johnny Pesky, Coleman enlisted in the Navy's Aviation Cadet Training Program located on the University of North Carolina at Chapel Hill campus.

He finished 19th in voting for the 1954 American League MVP for having a 13–17 win–loss record, 33 games, 32 games started, 15 complete games, 4 shutouts,  innings pitched, 184 hits allowed, 102 runs allowed, 86 earned runs allowed, 16 home runs allowed, 96 walks allowed, 103 strikeouts, 3 hit batsmen, 1 wild pitch, 912 batters faced, and a 3.50 ERA.

In 10 seasons he had a 52–76 win–loss record, 223 games, 140 games started, 60 complete games, 11 shutouts, 55 games finished, 6 saves, 1134 innings pitched, 1172 hits allowed, 616 runs allowed, 552 earned runs allowed, 92 home runs allowed, 566 walks allowed, 444 strikeouts, 13 hit batsmen, 19 wild pitches, 4993 batters faced, 3 balks, and a 4.38 ERA.

He died in Fort Myers, Florida, at the age of 74, in 1997.

See also
Third-generation Major League Baseball families

References

External links

Joe Coleman at SABR (Baseball BioProject)
Joe Coleman at Baseball Library

1922 births
1997 deaths
American League All-Stars
Baltimore Orioles players
Baseball players from Massachusetts
Buffalo Bisons (minor league) players
Detroit Tigers players
Major League Baseball pitchers
Malden Catholic High School alumni
Ottawa A's players
Philadelphia Athletics players
Savannah Indians players
Sportspeople from Medford, Massachusetts
Toronto Maple Leafs (International League) players
Wilmington Blue Rocks (1940–1952) players
United States Navy personnel of World War II
Newport News Pilots players
American expatriate baseball players in Canada